Cem Yiğit Üzümoğlu (born 1 March 1994) is a Turkish actor. He came to fame by appearing in the youth series Adı Efsane as Hakan.

Life and career
Üzümoğlu was born on 1 March 1994 in Istanbul. He is a graduate of Hacettepe University Ankara State Conservatory, Department of Acting. 

He made his debut on television with the youth series Adı Efsane as Hakan Şahin. In 2020, Üzümoğlu portrayed Mehmed the Conqueror in the Netflix original docuseries Rise of Empires: Ottoman. 

He had previously appeared in various plays. In April 2017, at the 21st Yapı Kredi Afife Theater Awards he was awarded as the "Most Successful Young Generation Artist of the Year". In 2018, he appeared on the stage again with the plays Troas and Kalp. In 2019, he joined the cast of Evlat, a play directed by İbrahim Çiçek.  He later appeared as Prince Hamlet in an adaptation of the famous play published for YouTube's Digital Sahne.

Filmography

Theatre

References 

Living people
1994 births
Male actors from Istanbul
Turkish male television actors
Turkish male stage actors
Hacettepe University Ankara State Conservatory alumni